The SAR 109T is a blowback 9×19mm submachine gun manufactured in 2014 by Sarsılmaz.

Design
The SAR 109T is a lightweight and modular submachine gun that resembles the American ArmaLite AR-15 (M16). According to the manufacturer, it discharges casings from the right in single shooting mode.

The barrel has polygonal rifling and a spin length of 2.5 mm. A force of 25 N is required to pull the trigger. The gun has a right turn 6-yiv set barrel profile.

The chassis of the 109T is a two-part aluminium alloy receiver with a hammer-fired mil-spec trigger. Firing controls include an M16-type non-reciprocating charging handle and an M16-style fire mode selector/safety switch.

The SAR 109T also features a Picatinny rail, which allows for quick mounting of NATO accessories without additional tools.

References 

 Weapons and ammunition introduced in 2014
 Turkish inventions
9mm Parabellum submachine guns
 Submachine guns of Turkey
 Firearms of Turkey